The Beeching cuts were a reduction of route network and restructuring of British Rail in the 1960s. Since the mid-1990s there has been significant growth in passenger numbers on the railways and renewed government interest in the role of rail in UK transport. Some closed stations have reopened, and rail passenger services been restored on a few lines where they had been removed.

Some former British Rail lines have become heritage railways.

Completed reopenings

London
 Snow Hill tunnel, south of Farringdon station, completely closed in the 1960s,  was reopened for passengers in 1988 as part of Thameslink, providing a link between the Midland Main Line and the former Southern Railway via London Blackfriars station.

South East
 The Chiltern Main Line was redoubled in two stages between 1998 and 2002, between Princes Risborough and Aynho Junction.
 The Romsey to Eastleigh link, closed to regular passenger services in 1969, reopened in 2003 along with the intermediate station at Chandler's Ford in Hampshire.
 Services on the London to Aylesbury Line were extended north along the former Great Central Main Line (closed in 1966) to a new station called Aylesbury Vale Parkway, which opened in December 2008. 
 The line from Oxford to Bicester reopened in 1987 after closing in 1968. As part of the East West Rail project, passenger services are to be restored to the section of line from Bicester to Bletchley.

South West
 Stations reopened include Ashchurch, Cam and Dursley, Feniton, Pinhoe, Templecombe and Yate.
 Service between Swindon and Trowbridge ceased in 1966 but two passenger trains each way were reinstated in 1985, along with the reopening of Melksham station. Passenger numbers rose rapidly, and the service – now increased in frequency and known as the TransWilts Line – was extended to Westbury.
 Regular passenger services between Yeovil Junction and Yeovil Pen Mill were withdrawn in 1968; a limited service was reinstated in 2015 and has since slowly increased.
 A summer Sunday service ran to Okehampton from 1997 to 2019, with a full daily service reinstated in 2021.

East Anglia/Lincolnshire
 Peterborough to Lincoln Line: the section between Peterborough and Spalding closed to passengers on 5 October 1970 and reopened on 7 June 1971.

East Midlands
 The Robin Hood Line in Nottinghamshire, between Nottingham and Worksop via Mansfield, reopened in the early 1990s.  Since closure in 1964 Mansfield had been the largest town in Britain without a rail link.
 The Kettering to Manton Jn Line via Corby closed to passengers on 18 April 1966. A shuttle service between Kettering and Corby was introduced in 1987, but the service was unreliable and lost funding support from the local council, leading to its closure in 1990. The line was then reopened on 23 February 2009 with Corby served by direct trains to London and a limited number of trains continuing on towards Oakham and Melton Mowbray.
 Alfreton, Langley Mill and Ilkeston stations on the Erewash Valley Line have since been reopened.
  (closed 1967 reopened 1981),  was closed in 1967 and reopened in 1972,  was closed in 1968 but reopened two years later,  was closed in 1968 and reopened 1976,  was closed in 1966 and reopened in 1989,  was closed in 1968 and reopened in 1994,  was closed in 1968 and replaced with a new station  in 1986 on an adjacent site.

West Midlands
The section of the Birmingham to Worcester via Kidderminster Line between Snow Hill to Smethwick was reopened in 1995. 
 The line from Snow Hill to Wolverhampton mainly reopened as the Midland Metro tram system.  
 The line from Coventry to Nuneaton reopened to passengers in 1988. 
 The Coventry to Leamington line reopened to passengers in 1977 and the station at Kenilworth reopened on 30 April 2018.
Some commentators believe an intermediate station at Willenhall should have been included with the original reopening.
 The Cotswold Line has been redoubled in places and Honeybourne station reopened.
 Coleshill closed in 1968 was rebuilt and reopened in 2007.

North East/Yorkshire
 Passenger service from Bradford to Huddersfield withdrawn in 1970 was reinstated in 2000 with reopening of  station. In 2017 trains also served  which was originally closed in 1965.

North West
  closed in 1967 was reopened in 1981 and  closed in 1966 was rebuilt in 1988.
 The route out of Manchester Central over the Cheshire Lines Committee's Manchester South District Line has been reopened by Metrolink.  The line opened to St Werburgh's Road (via Chorlton) in July 2011 and was extended as far as East Didsbury in May 2013.
  Regular passenger services between Blackburn and  including intermediate stations resumed in 1994.

North and Mid Wales
  closed in 1964 reopened in 1970 and  closed in 1964 but reopened the following year.  opened in 1989.
 On the North Wales Coast Line the following stations closed in 1966 have been reopened Shotton Low Level,  and 
  closed in 1965 was reopened on an adjacent site in 2021.

South Wales
 32 new stations and four lines reopened within 20 miles (32 km) of each other: Abercynon–Aberdare, Barry–Bridgend via , Bridgend–Maesteg and the Ebbw Valley Railway via Newbridge.

Scotland
 The Maryhill Line in Glasgow re-opened to stopping trains in 1993, which had ceased in the 1960s.  It is a suburban railway line linking central Glasgow (Queen Street station) and Anniesland via Maryhill.
 The Glasgow and South Western Railway's Paisley Canal line was closed to passengers in 1983.  The majority of the route reopened in 1990.
 The Caledonian Railway's Rutherglen and Coatbridge Railway closed to passengers in 1964. The majority of the route was reopened (with a revised terminus station at Whifflet) in 1993.  
 Stirling to Alloa reopened on 19 May 2008, providing a passenger service to Alloa on the route of the former Stirling-Dunfermline main line after a 40-year gap. This line had not been marked for closure by Beeching. The restored line also provides for freight onwards to Kincardine, and ultimately to Dunfermline by the slower, single track coastal route. Coal traffic ceased in 2016 on the closure of Longannet power station.
 A 35-mile (56 km) stretch of the former Waverley Route between Edinburgh and  via Galashiels reopened on 6 September 2015. The closure of the line in 1969 had left the Scottish Borders without any rail links.

Heritage railways

Further proposals

, proposals being pursued included

 East West Rail restoring passenger services between Bicester/ Aylesbury Vale Parkway to Milton Keynes. Future plans are to build a new railway between Bedford and Cambridge using part of the original alignment closed in 1968.
 Passenger service on the Portishead Railway stopped in 1964; plans are to reopen it as far as Portishead, possibly in 2024. Freight services ceased in 1981 (unrelated to Beeching) and resumed on part of the line in 2002.
 Camp Hill Line, West Midlands, planned to reopen in 2023 
 Stourbridge to Walsall line planned to open part as Midland Metro
 Levenmouth rail link, due to reopen in 2024
 Walsall-Wolverhampton line, due to reopen in 2022
 Blyth and Tyne Railway, known as the Northumberland Line project
 Charfield station, South Gloucestershire, proposed to reopen in 2024

In November 2017 the government announced plans to reverse some of the cuts made in the 1960s, and later cuts by British Rail, to restore lost capacity and introduce new routes to help with new housing or relieve congestion.

In December 2018, the Department for Transport confirmed that it was investigating a number of proposals to restore old lines in addition to plans to improve Heathrow links, reinstate stations on the Camp Hill Line in the West Midlands, reopen the Northumberland Line to passengers and build a new station at Cambridge South.

2020 initiative 
In January 2020, the Department for Transport announced a £500 million "Restoring Your Railway" fund and asked MPs, local authorities and community groups to make proposals to reinstate local services and reopen stations. The government also announced £1.5 million towards plans to reopen the Northumberland line, £100,000 towards assessment of the Fleetwood branch line, and £20 million for a third round of the New Stations Fund.

The £500 million would not be spent on building railway lines but on developing proposals through feasibility studies, business cases and designs. Proposals for projects would be sponsored by a local MP, gather local support, and then be put to a panel of experts chaired by the Rail Minister. Examples given were:

 upgrading a freight line to provide passenger services and restoring stations on it
 restoring track and services to an old alignment
 modifying an old route which has been built over.

Successful proposals will receive funding to develop their business case, which will be submitted to the Department for Transport in a bid for more substantial development funding.

In April 2020, the Department for Transport stated that any unsuccessful proposals would receive help from the department so they can improve their proposals for a later round of ideas. At the same time, due to the COVID-19 pandemic, the Department announced a third round of ideas for November 2020.

In May 2020, the Department announced that ten schemes had been successful in the first round of bidding:

 Reinstatement of  station
 Reinstatement of the branch lines on the Isle of Wight to Newport and 
 Reopening of Wellington and 
 Reinstatement of rail access to Devizes via a new station at Lydeway

In November 2020, the Department announced that fifteen further schemes had been successful in the second round of bidding, as well as the restoration of rail links to :

 Reopening 
 Reopening 
 Reopening 
 A new station at Waverley, South Yorkshire
 A new station in the area of Langport/Somerton, Somerset
 Upgrading the South Fylde Line
 Reinstating rail access to Cirencester

In November 2020, the Department announced that five schemes had been successful in the New Stations Fund 3:

 
 
 
 
  (see Deeside and Borderlands Line)

In October 2021, the third and final round of successful bids were announced, taking the number of schemes accepted for further feasibility studies to 38.

 Reopen the Darlington – Weardale line to passenger services
 Reopen the Ashton – Stockport line to passenger services
 Reopen the Middlewich line to passenger services
 Reopen the Rawtenstall – Buckley Wells line to passenger services
 Reopen  station
 Reopen  station
 Reinstate the line and provision of new services,  –  
 Reopen the Anglesey Central Railway ( – ) to passenger services
 Reopen the Stoke–Leek line 
 Reopen the  Branch line 
 Reopen the Don Valley line to passenger services
 Reinstate the York-Beverley line
The line had closed to passengers in 1972 but had been operated as a heritage railway from 1997 to 2019. Nine months of work by Network Rail included laying  of new track.

See also
 History of rail transport in Great Britain 1995 to date

References

Beeching closures
History of rail transport in the United Kingdom
Proposed rail infrastructure in the United Kingdom